Luigi Rosa (Venice, August 6, 1850 - Rome, 1919) was an Italian painter, mainly of vedute of his native lagoon.

He studied at the Royal Academy of Fine Arts of Venice. In 1880 at Turin, he exhibited Interior of the Church of the Frari in Venice, in 1881 at Milan and Venice: Sul Livenza; Maremma; Un rio; Un campo a Venezia e Sul Gorgazzo. In 1883 exhibited at Rome and Milan: Araldi; In Laguna; In the Lagoon after the rain; A Chioggia; and In Marzo. In 1884 at Turin, he displayed: A Summer Morning in the Lagoon; Venice, Pescheria; Venice, Sul prato; and In principio d'autunno. In 1887 to Venice, he sent: San Marco; Nubi d' estate; and finally to Bologna, in 1888: Venice, Case di Pescatori; Crepuscolo; and Alla Giudecca.

His daughter married Gian Francesco Malipiero, the pianist and orchestra director.

References

1850 births
1919 deaths
19th-century Italian painters
Italian male painters
20th-century Italian painters
Painters from Venice
Italian landscape painters
Accademia di Belle Arti di Venezia alumni
19th-century Italian male artists
20th-century Italian male artists